Dežno pri Podlehniku is a settlement in the Haloze Hills in the Municipality of Podlehnik in eastern Slovenia. The area traditionally belonged to the Styria region. It is now included in the Drava Statistical Region.

Name
The settlement was recorded in written sources in 1275 as in Dezzken and in 1440 as im ... Desachen, Deschene. The name is probably derived from the common noun deža 'squat round vessel', also used in the metaphorical sense 'hollow carved by water'. The name of the settlement was changed from Dežno to Dežno pri Podlehniku (literally, 'Dežno near Podlehnik') in 1953.

References

External links
Dežno pri Podlehniku on Geopedia

Populated places in the Municipality of Podlehnik